Gediminas Marcišauskas (born 1 January 1982) is a Lithuanian rugby union player. He plays as a centre.

He first played for Vairas Siauliai in Lithuania, where he won the National Championship. He signed for one year to the French team of Bordeaux RC Guizerois, aged 19 years old. He then would play for half year in Stade Bordelais. After a return to Vairas Siauliai, in Lithuania, he moved to Peterborough Lions RFUC, in the Midlands 2 East (South), which he represents since 2006/07.

He is one of the best players and top scorers for Lithuania, having played in the 2011 Rugby World Cup qualifyings, and in the historical spell of 18 games without losses.

External links
Gediminas Marcišauskas at the Official Site of Peterborough Lions

1982 births
Living people
Lithuanian rugby union players
Rugby union centres
Lithuanian expatriate rugby union players
Expatriate rugby union players in France
Expatriate rugby union players in England
Lithuanian expatriate sportspeople in France
Lithuanian expatriate sportspeople in England